Live at Carnegie Hall is the third live album by American blues rock band Stevie Ray Vaughan and Double Trouble, released by Epic Records in July 1997. The album consists of live selections from their sold-out October 4, 1984 benefit concert at Carnegie Hall for the T.J. Martell Foundation. Backed by a ten-piece big band for the second half of the event, Vaughan had celebrated his thirtieth birthday the night before, and called the concert his "best birthday ever, forever". The band's double-set performance, which included several blues and R&B standards, was highly successful, receiving mostly positive reviews from music critics.

Initially ranked as the top blues album of 1997, Live at Carnegie Hall peaked at number 40 on the Billboard 200, where it spent twelve weeks on the chart. The album was ultimately certified gold by the Recording Industry Association of America (RIAA) after selling over half a million units. Guests on the album include Vaughan's brother Jimmie Vaughan (guitar), Dr. John (keyboards), George Rains (drums) and the Roomful of Blues horn section, along with vocalist Angela Strehli. Related to the album, two outtakes from the concert were released on the SRV box set in November 2000.

Reception

The album charted at #40 on the Billboard 200, and was the #1 blues album for eight weeks. Thom Owens of Allmusic gave the album a rating of 4/5, stating there might have been "more musicians than usual on-stage, but Stevie Ray remains the center of attention...It's the best live Stevie Ray record released." Entertainment Weekly said that his "blistering fretwork is so technically formidable that it should awe even the most unflappable aficionados." Stephen Holden from The New York Times described the concert itself as "a stomping roadhouse."

Track listing
All songs were written by Stevie Ray Vaughan, except where noted.
 Intro - Ken Dashow / John Hammond – 2:09
 "Scuttle Buttin'" (instrumental) – 2:43
 "Testify" (instrumental) (Ronald Isley, O'Kelly Isley Jr., Rudolph Isley) – 5:20
 "Love Struck Baby" – 3:05
 "Honey Bee" – 3:05
 "Cold Shot" (Mike Kindred, W. C. Clark) – 4:45
 "Letter to My Girlfriend" (Eddie Jones) – 3:08
 "Dirty Pool" (Doyle Bramhall, Vaughan) – 6:40
 "Pride and Joy" – 4:48
 "The Things That I Used to Do" (Jones) – 5:26
 "C.O.D." (Leo Gooden) – 5:32
 "Iced Over" (AKA "Collins' Shuffle") (instrumental) (Gwen Collins/Stevie Ray Vaughan) - 5:11
 "Lenny" (instrumental) – 7:14
 "Rude Mood" (instrumental) – 2:22

Personnel
 Stevie Ray Vaughan – guitar, vocals
 Chris Layton – drums
 Tommy Shannon – bass

Special guests
 Jimmie Vaughan – guitar
 Dr. John – organ, piano
 George Rains – drums
 Bob Enos – trumpet
 Porky Cohen – trombone
 Rich Lataille – alto saxophone
 Greg Piccolo – tenor saxophone
 Doug James – baritone saxophone
 Angela Strehli – vocals on "C.O.D."

Production
 Stevie Ray Vaughan – producer
 Tony Martell – executive producer
 Richard Mullen – engineer
 Jeff Powell – mixer
 Kevin Nix - digital editing
 Bob Ludwig – mastering
 Brian Lee – mastering
 Josh Cheuse – art direction
 Chuck Pulin – photography

References

External links
 The Blog at Carnegie Hall: Live at Carnegie Hall - Stevie Ray Vaughan and Double Trouble

Stevie Ray Vaughan live albums
1997 live albums
Epic Records live albums
Albums recorded at Carnegie Hall
Live blues albums